Lukáš Rosol was the defending champion, but he lost in the second round to Ilija Bozoljac.Karol Beck won in the final 6–4, 6–4 against Gilles Müller

Seeds

Draw

Finals

Top half

Bottom half

External links
Main Draw
Qualifying Draw

Internazionali di Tennis di Bergamo Trofeo Trismoka - Singles
2010 Singles